Tom Larsen (born 22 April 1972) is a Norwegian cyclist. He competed in the men's cross-country mountain biking event at the 2000 Summer Olympics.

References

External links
 

1972 births
Living people
Norwegian male cyclists
Olympic cyclists of Norway
Cyclists at the 2000 Summer Olympics
Cyclists from Oslo